Robert L. Surtees (August 9, 1906 – January 5, 1985) was an American cinematographer who won three Academy Awards for the films King Solomon's Mines, The Bad and the Beautiful and the 1959 version of Ben-Hur. Surtees worked at various studios, including Universal, UFA, Warner Brothers, and MGM, lighting for notable directors Howard Hawks, Mike Nichols, and William Wyler, gaining him a reputation as one of the most versatile cinematographers of his time.

Early life and education
Robert L. Surtees was born in Covington, Kentucky, on August 9, 1906. He grew up in Ohio where he got a job as a photographer and retoucher at a portrait studio in Cincinnati. Surtees then moved to New York City for a year to study photography, but always had a goal of becoming a cinematographer.

Career
With an intention to attend college, Surtees moved to California in 1925. Roy C. Hunter at Universal offered him a job after some of his work was published in Towing Topics Automotive Club magazine. He assisted Harry Neumann, ASC, on a Hoot Gibson Western Hey, Hey Cowboy in 1925, Jerry Ash, ASC, on the Andy Gump comedies also in 1925, and Jackson Rose, ASC, on the Reginald Denny Leather Pushers series in 1926. The Man Who Laughs (1928), photographed by Gil Warrenton, ASC was Surtees' first high budget picture as an assistant.

From 1928 to 1929 Surtees worked for Universal and UFA as an assistant to Charles Stumar in France, Germany, Switzerland, and Italy. Some sources say that he assisted Gregg Toland and Joseph Ruttenburg in the latter years of the 1920s before going abroad and this is what kick-started his career. In 1930 Surtees returned to California and assisted Hal Mohr, ASC, on King of Jazz. He went on to shoot 36 pictures with Mohr at Universal, Warner Brothers, Pathé and Fox Studios over a period of 6 years from 1930 to 1936. In 1935, Surtees applied to be a member of the ASC as a camera operator just after completing 13 weeks as an operator at Warner Brother's Studios on the film A Midsummer Night's Dream (1935).

Surtees' first film as a director of photography was This Precious Freedom (1942), a propaganda film made for the US army, which was only released to the military.

He shot a few more pictures with various directors such as Frank Buck and Ed Sutherland on Jacquerai in September 1942, and Les Goodwins on Ice Capades in October 1942. On October 20, 1942, Surtees submitted another application to ASC as a director of photography while employed at Freelance Independent Producers.

Shortly after this Surtees landed a job at MGM where he began his long tenure and produced his most notable work beginning with Thirty Seconds Over Tokyo, shot alongside Harold Rosson, ASC and nominated for an Oscar in the category of Black and White Cinematography in 1944.  Robert Surtees went on to film nearly 100 motion pictures in his 48-year career, including King Solomon's Mines (1950), The Bad and the Beautiful (1952), and Ben Hur (1959), which each won an Oscar. Not to mention his 13 other films that also received nomination for Best Cinematography, including The Graduate (1967), The Last Picture Show (1971), and The Sting (1973).

Legacy
Surtees was a sought-after cinematographer because of his versatility -— "I have liked doing all kinds of pictures—musical, comedies, and action-adventure".  He also gained a reputation for being a stickler for precise color control and proper exposure of the negative, arranging his lighting and camera angles so he could provide the lab with the best negative he could make.

Surtees enjoyed experimenting with lighting, and always found ways to properly light a scene, even without all the necessary equipment; for instance, on King Solomon's Mines (1950), when generators could not be transported throughout the dense African jungle, Surtees lit the whole film with reflectors.

He also played a role with regards to technological innovations, being one of the first to use a telephoto lens (500mm) in The Graduate (1967).

Personal life
Robert Surtees married Maydell Lois James in 1930 before moving to California. The couple had two daughters (Linda, later Linda Lowers, and Nancy, later Nancy Corby), as well as two sons (Thomas and Bruce). Bruce was also a director of photography, working alongside his father on Lost Horizon (1973), as a first cameraman on a second camera unit.

Robert Surtees died on January 5, 1985, following a long illness.

Filmography

Academy Awards and nominations
Robert L. Surtees Best Cinematography 
 Nominee Thirty Seconds Over Tokyo (1944) Shared with: Harold Rosson
 Winner King Solomon's Mines (1950)
 Nominee Quo Vadis (1951) Shared with: William V. Skall
 Winner The Bad and the Beautiful (1952)
 Nominee Oklahoma! (1955)
 Winner Ben-Hur (1959)
 Nominee Mutiny on the Bounty (1962)
 Nominee The Graduate (1967)
 Nominee Doctor Dolittle (1967)
 Nominee Summer of '42 (1971)
 Nominee The Last Picture Show (1971)
 Nominee The Sting (1973)
 Nominee The Hindenburg (1975)
 Nominee A Star Is Born (1976)
 Nominee The Turning Point (1977)
 Nominee Same Time, Next Year (1978)

Further reading
 "On filming 'Quo Vadis'". Films in Review V. 19 no.2 (February 1968): 89. Print.
 "The Graduate's photography". Films in Review V.3 no.4 (April 1952) 184. Print.
 "Cinematographer with a 'Split Personality'". American Cinematographer (February 1968): 104-111. Print.
 "The Turning Point". American Cinematographer (May 1978): 466. Print.

References

External links
 
 Surtees, Robert L. 1935–1985. American Society of Cinematographer's Collection, Margaret Herrick Library, Academy of Motion Picture Arts and Sciences

1906 births
1985 deaths
American cinematographers
Best Cinematographer Academy Award winners
People from Covington, Kentucky
People from Cincinnati